There are 42 accepted species of flowering plants in the genus Dahlia, according to The Plant List. The sectional classification of Dahlia  sensu Sørensen (1969) as updated by Saar et al. (2003) and Hansen (2004) and (2008) is as follows (excluding infraspecific taxa);

Section Pseudodendron 
D. campanulata 
D. excelsa 
D. imperialis 
D. tenuicaulis 
Section Entemophyllon 
D. congestifolia 
D. dissecta 
D. foeniculifolia 
D. linearis 
D. rupicola 
D. scapigeroides 
D. sublignosa 
Section Dahlia 
D. apiculata 
D. atropurpurea 
D. australis  
D. barkeriae 
D. brevis 
D. coccinea 
D. cordifolia  syn. D. cardiophylla
D. cuspidata 
D. hintonii 
D. hjertingii 
D. mollis 
D. moorei 
D. neglecta 
D. parvibracteata 
D. pteropoda 
D. purpusii 
D. rudis 
D. sherffii 
D. scapigera 
D. sorensenii 
D. spectabilis 
D. tamaulipana 
D. tenuis 
D. tubulata 
Subsection Merckii 
D. merckii  (sometimes spelled Dahlia merkii)
Section Epiphytum 
D. macdougallii 
Unresolved
D. pinnata Type (more properly D. × pinnata) Most likely (= D. coccinea × D. sorensenii).
D. mixtecana  (possibly Section Dahlia or Section Entemophyllon)
D. variabilis

See also
List of Dahlia cultivars

References

List
Dahlia